A list of books about Prohibition era gangster Al Capone:

 
 
 
 
 
 
 
 
 
 
 
 
 
 
 
 
 
Al Capone